Giacomo Piccardo (born 11 July 1999) is an Italian football player.

Club career

Sampdoria 
He is a product of Sampdoria youth teams and started playing for their Under-19 squad in the 2016–17 season.

Loan to Albissola 
On 10 July 2018, Piccardo joined to Serie C club Albissola on a season-long loan deal. On 21 October he made his professional debut in Serie C for Albissola in a 2–0 away defeat against Arezzo as a starter. On 7 November he kept his first clean sheet for Albissola in a 1–0 away win over Novara. Four days later, on 11 November, he kept his second consecutive clean sheet in a 1–0 home win over Juventus U23. On 25 November he kept his third clean sheet in another 1–0 win over Pro Piacenza. Piccardo ended his season-long loan to Albissola with 17 appearances, 3 clean sheets and 21 goals conceded.

Career statistics

Club

References

External links
 

1999 births
Footballers from Genoa
Living people
Italian footballers
Association football goalkeepers
Serie C players
Albissola 2010 players
Boston College Eagles men's soccer players
Davidson Wildcats men's soccer players